Ultimate Collection is a compilation by American R&B singer Shanice, containing songs from her first three albums. The collection was released on November 16, 1999, but does not include any tracks from her fourth album Shanice, released earlier that year, or any of her previous contributions to soundtracks or other artists' albums.

As a result, the singles omitted include "Saving Forever For You" (a Billboard Hot 100 #4 hit - one of only two of her singles to make the top 10), "This Time" (a #2 US R&B hit recorded with Kiara for Kiara's album To Change and/or Make a Difference), "It's for You" (a #14 US R&B hit recorded for The Meteor Man soundtrack) and "When I Close My Eyes" (a #4 US R&B hit recorded for Shanice).

Track listings

Personnel and credits
Credits taken from album liner notes.

Executive-Producer – Pat Lawrence
Producer – Bryan Loren (track: 4, 5, 6, 7, 8) – Narada Michael Walden (track: 2, 3, 9, 10, 11, 12, 13) – Christopher Williams, Ike Lee III, Kiyamma Griffin (track: 14) – Chris Stokes (track: 15) – Lance Alexander, Tony Tolbert (track: 16) – Bo Watson, McArthur (track: 17) – Guy Roche (track: 18)
Art Direction – Laura Graven, Vartan 
Compilation Producer – Dana G. Smart, David Nathan 
Coordinator [Project Coordination] – Laura Graven
Design – Ryan Rogers
Liner Notes [Essay By] – David Nathan 
Mastered By [Digitally Mastered By] – Kevin Reeves

Phonographic Copyright (p) – A&M Records, Inc.
Phonographic Copyright (p) – Motown Record Company, L.P.
Phonographic Copyright (p) – Universal Music Special Markets, Inc.
Copyright (c) – Universal Music Special Markets, Inc.
Distributed By – Universal Music & Video Distribution, Inc.

References

1999 compilation albums
Shanice albums
Albums produced by Narada Michael Walden
Contemporary R&B compilation albums
Pop compilation albums
New jack swing compilation albums